Carmen Boullosa (born September 4, 1954 in Mexico City, Mexico) is a Mexican poet, novelist and playwright. Her work focuses on the issues of feminism and gender roles within a Latin American context. It has been praised by a number of writers, including Carlos Fuentes, Alma Guillermoprieto, Roberto Bolaño and Elena Poniatowska, as well as publications such as Publishers Weekly.

Early life
Boullosa was born on September 4, 1954 in Mexico City, Mexico.

Career
Boullosa has published eighteen novels. Though all different from one another, on theme and form, Boullosa's style has a distinctive personality.

One of her novels, Son vacas, somos puercos (1991, translated into English in 1997 as They're Cows, We're Pigs) is narrated in the first person by an old man looking back on his life.  He was kidnapped and sent from his native France on a slave ship to the West Indies at the age of thirteen.  To gain his freedom, he joins a group of pirates (or "pigs"), allowing Boullosa to compare two very different societal and political systems—traditional Europe and carefree pirates.  In La milagrosa, a novel written in 1993, the protagonist is a girl who has the power to heal the sick and perform other miracles while she sleeps. She falls in love with Aurelio Jimenez, a detective sent to discredit her, even though she fears that her powers will disappear if she spends time with people.  It ends ambiguously, leaving an unsolved murder without closure.  Duerme, another popular work published in 1995, tells the story of Claire, a French woman whose mother was a prostitute. Attempting to escape the same profession, she arrives in Spain dressed as a man.  To save a subject of the Spanish king, she reveals herself as a female and prepares to take his punishment of death by hanging.  Beforehand, however, she is wounded in the left breast and her blood is replaced by water from the lakes of Mexico City.  The water's magical powers make it possible for her to survive the punishment.

Boullosa is also well known for her Teatro herético (1987), a compilation of three parodies in play format—Aura y las once mil vírgenes, Cocinar hombres, and Propusieron a María.  The first tells the story of a man called by God to "deflower" eleven thousand virgins in his life, so that heaven's overpopulation problem might be addressed, since the women will have to wait in purgatory for a time. The man then uses his sexual encounters as material for his television commercials and becomes a successful advertising agent. Cocinar hombres tells the story of two girls who find themselves to have become young adult witches overnight, so as to fly over the earth tempting but not satisfying men.  Finally, the third play satirically recounts the conversation between Joseph and Mary before Mary gives birth to Jesus and ascends to heaven.

Awards
 2019, Premio Casa de América de Poesía Americana

Personal life
Boullosa had two children, Juan Aura and actress María Aura, with her former partner, Alejandro Aura. She is now married to author Mike Wallace.

Works

Poems

 Hamartia o Hacha, Editorial Hiperión-UANL, 2015.
 La patria insomne, Editorial Hiperión, Madrid, 2012., 
 Allucinata e Selvaggia, Poesia scelte 1989-2004. A cura di Marta Canfield. Ed. Lietocolle, Florence, Italy, 2008. 
 Salto de mantarraya (y otros dos),  Fondo de Cultura Económica, México, 2004.
 La bebida, Fondo de Cultura Económica, Mexico, 2002.
 Salto de mantarraya, illustr. Philip Hughes, trans. Psiche Hughes, The Old School Press, England, 2002.
 Agua, con dibujos de Juan Soriano, Taller Martín Pescador, México, 2000. Jardín Elíseo, Elyssian Garden, trad. Psiche Hugues, litografías de Phillip Hughes, Monterrey, México, 1999.
 La Delirios, Fondo de Cultura Económica, Mexico City, 1998.  
 Niebla, Taller Martín Pescador, México, 1997.
 Envenenada: antología personal, Fondo Editorial Pequeña Venecia, Venezuela, 1993.
 Soledumbre, Universidad Autónoma Metropolitana (Mexico City), 1992.
 La salvaja, FCE, México, 1989. 
 La salvaja, Taller Martín Pescador, México, 1988.
 Abierta, Delegación Venustiano Carranza (Mexico), 1983.
 Lealtad, illust. Magali Lara, Taller Martín Pescador, Mexico City, 1981.
 Ingobernable, Universidad Nacional Autónoma de Mexico, 1979.
 El hilo olvida, La Máquina de Escribir, Mexico City, 1979.

Books

 El libro de Ana, Siruela Ediciones, Madrid, 2016,. Editorial Alfaguara, México.2016.
 Texas, Editorial Alfaguara, México. English translation: TEXAS, translated by Samantha Schnee, Deep Vellum, 2014.
 Las paredes hablan, Ediciones Siruela, Madrid, Autumn, 2010.
 El complot de los románticos, Ediciones Siruela, Madrid, 2009.
 La virgen y el violín, Ediciones Siruela, Madrid, 2008.
 El velázquez de París, Ediciones Siruela, Madrid, 2007.
 La novela perfecta, Editorial Alfaguara, México, 2006.
 La otra mano de Lepanto, Ediciones Siruela, Madrid, 2005. Fondo de Cultura Económica, México, 2005, . A Outra Mâo de Lepanto, translated to the Portuguese by Paulo César Thomaz, Editora Palindromo, São Paulo, Brasil, September, 2006.
 De un salto descabalga la reina, Editorial Debate, Madrid, 2002. English version: Cleopatra Dismounts, Grove Press, 2003, trans. Geoff Hargreaves.
 Treinta años, Alfaguara, 1999. English version: Leaving Tabasco, Grove Press, New York, 2001, trans. Geoff Hargraves.
 Cielos de la tierra, Alfaguara, 1997. English version: Heavens on Earth, trans. Shelby Vincent, forthcoming at Deep Vellum, 2016, .
 Quizá, Monte Avila Editores, Caracas, 1995.
 Duerme, Alfaguara, Madrid, 1994. German: Der fremde Tod, edition Suhrkamp, 1994, trans. Susanne Lange. French: Duerme, L’eau des lacs du temps jadis, L’atalante, 1997, and Le serpent a plumes 1999, trans. by Claude Fell. Italian: Dorme, Ed. Le Lettere, 2000, trans. Antonella Ciabatti. Dutch: De Schone Slaapster, Arena, Amsterdam, 1995, trans. Aline Glastra von Loon. Will soon appear in Arab. 
 La milagrosa, Ediciones ERA, 1993. English version: The Miracle Worker, Jonathan Cape, London, 1994, trans. Amanda Hopkinson. German: 
 Die Wundertäterin, edition Surhkamp, 1993, trans. Susanne Lange. Italian: La Miracolosa, Vallecchi Editore, 1996, and La Milagrosa, Feltrinelli, 2001, trans. Pino Cacucci.
 El Médico de los piratas: bucaneros y filibusteros en el Caribe, Ediciones Siruela, Madrid, 1992.
 Llanto: novelas imposibles, Ediciones ERA, 1992.
 Son vacas, somos puercos: filibusteros del mar Caribe, Ediciones ERA, Mexico City, 1991, . English version: They're Cows, We're Pigs, Grove Press, New York, 1997, trans. Lee Chambers. German: Sir sind Kühe, wir sind Schweine, edition Surhkamp, trans. Erna Pfeiffer, 1991; French: Eux les vaches, nous les porcs, Le serpent a plumes, Paris, 2002, trans. Claude Fell.
 Antes, Vuelta, Mexico City, 1989. German version: Verfolgt, trans. Susanne Lange, Aufbau-Verlag, Berlin, 1996. Chinese: ed. 1999. French: Avant, Les Allusifs, trans. Sabine Coudassot-Ramírez, Quebec, Canadá, 2002. Before, translated by Peter Bush, Deep Vellum, forthcoming 2016. Several reprints at Alfaguara, Punto de Lectura, 
 Mejor desaparece, Océano, Mexico City, 1987. English version: Just disappear, trans. Christi Rodgers, VDM Verlag, 2009.

References

Sources
 Contemporary Authors Online, Thomson Gale, 2004

External links
Boullosa's homepage
Interview in BOMB Magazine

Mexican women poets
Mexican feminists
Mexican feminist writers
1954 births
Writers from Mexico City
Living people
Georgetown University faculty
Columbia University faculty
New York University faculty
City College of New York faculty
Mexican women academics
Mexican women novelists
Mexican dramatists and playwrights
Women dramatists and playwrights